Eric Jacobsen  (born June 2, 1994) is an American professional basketball player for Ibaraki Robots of the B.League. The Arizona-born big man played four years of college basketball for Arizona State before starting his professional career in 2016.

Early years
Jacobsen attended Hamilton High School in Chandler, Arizona where he was highly recruited. Having offers with multiple Divisions I schools. But untimely signed with Arizona State. Averaged 12.4 points and 10.3 boards per game in his senior season at Hamilton High School and led Hamilton to an 18–11 record his junior year while averaging 15.9 points, 11.7 rebounds, and 2.3 blocks per game.

College career

Freshman and sophomore years
Posted a season high 16 points off the bench against Hartford in a win. Played in 32 games in freshman season and shot .488 from the field. Jacobsen saw his role solidify during his sophomore seeing his minutes and usage in important scenarios increase. Started in all of ASU's final 15 games this year and in an NCAA tournament game.

Junior and senior years
Jacobsen saw his best year junior year (2014–15) where he averaged a career high 8.3 points per game. For the first time in his Sun Devil career Jacobsen scored 20 points and grabbed a team nine rebounds in a win against Pepperdine on December 13. Started and played in all 32 games during his senior season. Led ASU by shooting 57.6% FG, making (91-158) total field goals.

College statistics

|-
| style="text-align:left;"| 2012–13
| style="text-align:left;"| Arizona State
| 31 || 1 || 7.5 || .488 || .000 || .500 || 1.3 || 0.2 || .0 || 0.1 || 1.7
|-
| style="text-align:left;"| 2013–14
| style="text-align:left;"| Arizona State
| 32 || 15 || 10.9 || .491 || .000 || .610 || 2.2 || 0.2 || 0.2|| 0.4 || 2.4
|-
| style="text-align:left;"| 2014–15
| style="text-align:left;" | Arizona State
| 34 || 34 || 28.6 || .626 || .000 || .569 || 5.9 || 0.9 || 0.5 || 1.2 || 8.2
|-
| style="text-align:left;"| 2015–16
| style="text-align:left;"| Arizona State
| 32 || 32 || 28.9 || .476 || .500 || .639 || 5.0 || 0.5 || 0.2 || 0.9 || 7.6
|- class="sortbottom"
| align="center" colspan="2"| Career
| 129 || 82 || 19.5 || .576 || .500 || .590 || 3.7 || 0.5 || 0.3 || 0.6 || 5.1

Professional career
After going undrafted in the 2016 NBA draft Jacobsen played in the 2016 NBA Summer League as a member of the Cleveland Cavaliers. In seven game he averaged 3.4 pointer per game while only playing 9.1 minutes per game. He did not make the Cavs pre-season roster.

In July 2016 Jacobsen was chosen for the final roster spot of the Adelaide 36ers.

In August 2017 Jacobsen was signed to play in Fukuoka, Japan for the Rizing Zephyr Fukuoka.

References

External links
 Eric Jacobsen bio — ESPN

1994 births
Living people
Adelaide 36ers players
American expatriate basketball people in Australia
American expatriate basketball people in Japan
American men's basketball players
Arizona State Sun Devils men's basketball players
Basketball players from Arizona
Centers (basketball)
Power forwards (basketball)
Rizing Zephyr Fukuoka players
Sportspeople from Chandler, Arizona